Campolongo Maggiore is a town in the Metropolitan City of Venice, Veneto, Italy. It is northeast of SS516.

The Cunetta Brenta separates the principal village from Bojon, the main frazione.

Campolongo Maggiore is governed by a centre-left political party.

It is notorious for being the hometown of Felice Maniero, former boss of the criminal organization Mala del Brenta.

Sources
(Google Maps)

References

Cities and towns in Veneto